Fernaldia pandurata (common name: loroco ) is a vine with edible flowers, widespread in El Salvador, Guatemala, and other countries in Central America.

Fernaldia pandurata is an important source of food in Guatemala and El Salvador. The plant's buds and flowers are used for cooking in a variety of ways, including in pupusas.

The name "loroco" is used throughout Mesoamerica to refer to Fernaldia pandurata.

References

 
 León, J., H. Goldbach & J. Engels, 1979: Die genetischen Ressourcen der Kulturpflanzen Zentralamerikas., Int. Genbank CATIE/GTZ in Turrialba, Costa Rica, San Juan de Tibás, Costa Rica, 32 pp.
 Morton, J. F., E. Alvarez & C. Quiñonez, 1990: Loroco, Fernaldia pandurata'' (Apocynaceae): a popular edible flower of Central America. Economic Botany 44, 301–310.

External links

 Loroco in World Crops (English)

Echiteae
Edible plants
Flora of Central America
Flora of Mexico
Salvadoran cuisine
Guatemalan cuisine
Plants described in 1844